Freddie McKay (sometimes Freddy McKay) (1947 – 19 November 1986) was a Jamaican singer, whose career spanned the rocksteady and reggae eras.

Biography
McKay, born in Saint Catherine Parish, Jamaica, is regarded as one of the most soulful singers to come out of Jamaica. McKay first recorded for producer Prince Buster in 1967, his first hit coming the same year with "Love Is A Treasure", recorded for Duke Reid's Treasure Isle set-up. McKay then enjoyed a fruitful spell with Coxsone Dodd, recording a number of popular songs for Studio One backed by The Soul Defenders, including "High School Dance", "Sweet You Sour You", and "Picture on the Wall", the latter the title track of his 1971 debut album. A second album, Lonely Man followed in 1974. McKay recorded a duet with Horace Andy in 1975, "Talking Love" which was also a hit in Jamaica. McKay enjoyed another hit in 1976 with "Dance This Ya Festival", which won the Jamaican Independence Popular Song Contest that year. McKay teamed up with Alvin Ranglin for the misleadingly titled The Best Of Freddie McKay (it was an album of new recordings) in 1977, McKay now adapting to the prevailing roots reggae style. The Ossie Hibbert-produced showcase album Creation followed in 1979, and Tribal Inna Yard in 1983.

McKay maintained a faithful following until his death in 1986 from a heart attack, shortly after finishing his final album, I'm a Free Man.

His son, Andrew Chin, known under the pseudonym Brushy One String, is a musician known for playing a one-stringed guitar.

Discography

Albums
Picture On The Wall (1971, Studio One)
Lonely Man (1974, Dragon UK / Dynamic Jamaica) (reissued 1996, Lagoon)
Fire is Burning (1976, Amethyst Records)
The Best Of Freddie McKay (1977, GG's)
Creation (1979, Plant and Joe Gibbs)
Harsh Words (1982 Gorgon)
Tribal Inna Yard (1983, Move)
I'm a Free Man (1988 Uptempo)
Freddie McKay & Soul Defenders at Studio One (1991, Heartbeat)
The Right Time Recordings (1997, GG's) (with Jah Stone)
The Right Time (1999, Rhino)
When You're Smiling (2002, Rhino) (Lonely Man + bonus tracks)
Doin' It Right (2003, Charly)

Single
Freddie McKay – "Dance Dis A Festival" – 1976 Carifest Winning Song

References

1947 births
1986 deaths
Jamaican reggae musicians
20th-century Jamaican male singers
People from Saint Catherine Parish